The Dene are an aboriginal group of First Nations in northern Canada.

Dene or Denes may also refer to:
 Dene (valley), a steep-sided valley
 Dene language, the language of the Dene people
 Dene, Newcastle upon Tyne
 River Dene, in Warwickshire, England

People

Given name 
 Dene Cropper (born 1983), English footballer
 Dene Davies (born 1947), Australian motorcycle speedway rider
 Dene Halatau (born 1983), New Zealand rugby league footballer
 Dene Hills (born 1970), Australian cricketer
 Dene Miller (born 1981), British rugby league footballer
 Dene O'Kane (born 1963), New Zealand snooker player
 Dene Olding (born 1956), Australian violinist
 Dene Shields (born 1982), Scottish footballer
 Dene Simpson (born 1956), South African sprint canoer
 Dene Smuts (1949–2016), South African politician
 Denes Agay (1912–2007), American composer and author

Surname 
 Agnes Denes (born 1931), American conceptual artist
 Dorothy Dene (1859–1899), English stage actress
 Graham Dene (born 1949), British radio personality
 Terry Dene (born 1938), British pop singer

See also
Denée (disambiguation)